The 1947 Copa Aldao was the final match to decide the winner of the Copa Aldao, the 17th. edition of the international competition organised by the Argentine and Uruguayan Associations together. The final was contested by Uruguayan club Nacional and Argentine side River Plate.

In the first match, played at played at Estadio Centenario in Montevideo, River Plate won 4–3 while in the second leg, held in San Lorenzo de Almagro Stadium, River beat Nacional again 3–1. Thus, River Plate won the series and set a record of five Copa Aldao won over six editions contested.

Qualified teams

Venues

Match details

First leg

Second leg 

|}

References

1947 in Argentine football
1947 in Uruguayan football
Club Atlético River Plate matches
Club Nacional de Football matches
Football in Buenos Aires
Football in Montevideo